"The Fabulous Philosopher's Stone" is an Uncle Scrooge comics story written and drawn by Carl Barks in October 1954. The story was first published in Uncle Scrooge #10 (June 1955).

Plot
Scrooge McDuck takes Donald Duck and his three grandnephews on an expedition to find the Philosopher's Stone, a mythical artifact that would turn common metals into gold. The stone is eventually found, and works. But it has some rather unpleasant side effects.

Scrooge is eventually forced to give up the stone and gives it to Monsieur Mattressface of the International Money Council.

Changes made in reprints

In this story, Scrooge refers to the year 1110 as "845 years ago". When the story was reprinted in Uncle Scrooge #253 (April 1991), the reference was changed to "881 years ago".

Sequels
The International Money Council and Monsieur Mattressface later appeared in The Crown of the Crusader Kings (2001) and The Old Castle's Other Secret (2004) by Don Rosa.

See also
List of Disney comics by Carl Barks

References

External links

The Fabulous Philosopher's Stone in Carl Barks guidebook

Disney comics stories
Donald Duck comics by Carl Barks
1954 in comics